Insight , successor to The Youth's Instructor, was a weekly magazine designed for Seventh-day Adventist young people, published from 1970-2017 by Review and Herald. It was described as one of the "most important" Adventist magazines.

History and profile

The predecessor magazine, known as The Youth's Instructor, was established in 1852 by James White, husband of Ellen G. White. It was distributed primarily through the Sabbath schools.

Under the editorship of Lora E. Clement in the early-mid 1900s, the circulation increased from about 25,000 to 50,000.

The Youth's Instructor was replaced by Insight in 1970. The headquarters of Insight was in Hagerstown, Maryland.

Editors of The Youth's Instructor (selected) 

 1852: James White
 1869–1871: Goodloe Harper Bell

 1923–1952: Lora E. Clement (who lived from 1890 to 1958)
  1952-1970: Walter Crandall

Editors of Insight (selected) 

 F. Donald Yost (associate editors: Pat Horning, Chuck Scriven)

Roland Hegsted, acting editor
 Mike Jones

1986: Chris Blake
1993: Lori Peckham
2009: Dwain Esmond
2013: Omar Miranda

Notable contributor to The Youth's Instructor 
 Edmund C. Jaeger, renowned naturalist and author (121 articles from 1908 to 1922)

See also

 List of Seventh-day Adventist periodicals

References

External links 
 Official website
 Archives:
 The Youth's Instructor from Adventist Archives (DjVu and PDF formats)
 Cover story archives, from 2006 onwards

Weekly magazines published in the United States
English-language magazines
Magazines established in 1970
Magazines published in Maryland
Magazines established in 1852
Seventh-day Adventist magazines published in the United States
1852 establishments in the United States